Li Auto Inc., also known as Li Xiang, is a Chinese electric vehicle manufacturer headquartered in Beijing, with manufacturing facilities in Changzhou.

History
In 2015, Li Auto was created by Li Xiang. The company builds electric vehicles that use range extenders for a power supply. Li Auto has vehicle manufacturing, engineering, and design services located in Changzhou, Jiangsu Province with corporate headquarters and research and development located in Beijing. The company debuted on the Nasdaq in 2020. Investors of the company include Meituan and Source Code Capital.

Models
The company focuses primarily on premium EREV SUVs for the Chinese market. Four such vehicles have been announced: 

 Li One (2019 - 2022)
 Li Auto L9 (2022 - present)
 Li Auto L8 (2022 - present)
 Li Auto L7 (2023)

Sales

See also
 Byton
 Nio Inc.
 Polestar
 Tesla, Inc.
 XPeng

References

External links 

 Official website

Battery electric vehicle manufacturers
Car brands
Car manufacturers of China
Chinese companies established in 2015
Vehicle manufacturing companies established in 2015
Manufacturing companies based in Beijing
Electric vehicle manufacturers of China
Multinational companies headquartered in China
Companies listed on the Nasdaq
2020 initial public offerings
Plug-in hybrid vehicle manufacturers